Miss Polski 2019 was the 30th Miss Polski pageant, held on December 8, 2019. The winner was Magdalena Kasiborska of Silesia. Kasiborska was originally supposed to represent Poland in Miss Universe 2020 but had to withdraw due to health reasons. The 1st Runner-up, Natalia Piguła of Łódź, replaced her and represented the country at Miss Universe.

Final results

Special Awards

Finalists

Notes

Withdrawals
 Holy Cross
 Kuyavia-Pomerania
 Lublin
 Polish Community in the U.K.

Did not compete
 Lubusz
 Lower Silesia
 Upper Poland
 Polish Community in Argentina
 Polish Community in Australia
 Polish Community in Belarus
 Polish Community in Brazil
 Polish Community in Canada
 Polish Community in Czechia
 Polish Community in France
 Polish Community in Germany
 Polish Community in Ireland
 Polish Community in Israel
 Polish Community in Kazakhstan
 Polish Community in Lithuania
 Polish Community in Russia
 Polish Community in Slovakia
 Polish Community in South Africa
 Polish Community in Sweden
 Polish Community in Ukraine
 Polish Community in the U.S.
 Polish Community in Venezuela

References

External links
Official Website

2019
2019 beauty pageants
2019 in Poland